The rate of participation of women in the Olympic Games has been increasing since their first participation in 1900. Some sports are uniquely for women, others are contested by both sexes, while some older sports remain for men only. Studies of media coverage of the Olympics consistently show differences in the ways in which women and men are described and the ways in which their performances are discussed. The representation of women on the International Olympic Committee has run well behind the rate of female participation, and it continues to miss its target of a 20% minimum presence of women on their committee.

History of women at the Olympics

1900 

The first modern Olympic Games to feature female athletes was the 1900 Games in Paris. Hélène de Pourtalès of Switzerland became the first woman to compete at the Olympic Games and became the first female Olympic champion, as a member of the winning team in the first 1 to 2 ton sailing event on May 22, 1900. Briton Charlotte Cooper became the first female individual champion by winning the women's singles tennis competition on July 11. Tennis and golf were the only sports where women could compete in individual disciplines. 22 women competed at the 1900 Games, 2.2% of all the competitors. Alongside sailing, golf and tennis, women also competed in croquet.

There were several firsts in the women's golf. This was the first time ever that women competed in the Olympic Games. The women's division was won by Margaret Abbott of Chicago Golf Club. Abbott shot a 47 to win and became the first ever American female to win a gold medal in the Olympic Games, though she received a gilded porcelain bowl as a prize instead of a medal. She is also the second overall American woman to receive an Olympic medal. Abbott's mother, Mary Abbott, also competed in this Olympic event and finished tied for seventh, shooting a 65. They were the first and only mother and daughter that have ever competed in the same Olympic event at the same time. Margaret never knew that they were competing in the Olympics; she thought it was a normal golf tournament and died not knowing. Her historic victory was not known until University of Florida professor Paula Welch began to do research into the history of the Olympics and discovered that Margaret Abbott had placed first. Over the course of ten years, she contacted Abbott's children and informed them of their mother's victory.

Two women also competed in the hacks and hunter combined (chevaux de selle) equestrian event at the 1900 Games (Jane Moulin and Elvira Guerra). Originally only the jumping equestrian events were counted as "Olympic", but IOC records later added the hacks and hunter and mail coach races to the official list of 1900 events, retroactively making Moulin and Guerra among the first female Olympians.

1904–1916 
In 1904, the women's archery event was added.

London 1908 had 37 female athletes who competed in archery, tennis and figure skating.

Stockholm 1912 featured 47 women in sports events. Swimming and diving were added, but figure skating and archery were removed. The Art competitions that were introduced at those Olympics were also open to women, but full records of the entrants were not kept. 
 
The 1916 Summer Olympics were due to be held in Berlin but were cancelled following the outbreak of World War I.

1920–1928 

In 1920, 65 women competed at the Games. Archery was added back into the programme.

A record 135 female athletes competed at Paris 1924. At the 1924 Summer Olympics held the same year in Paris, women's fencing made its debut with Dane, Ellen Osiier winning the inaugural gold. Archery was again removed from the programme of sports. Dorothy Margaret Stuart was the first woman to gain a medal in the Arts, winning silver in Mixed Literature.

In 1924 the first Winter Olympics also took place, with women competing only in the figure skating. Herma Szabo became the first ever female Winter Olympic champion when she won the ladies' singles competition.

At the 1928 Winter Olympics in St Moritz, no changes were made to any female events. Fifteen year old Sonja Henie won her inaugural of three Olympic gold medals.

At the Summer Games of the same year, women's athletics and gymnastics made their debut. In athletics, women competed in the 100 metres, 800 metres, 4 × 100 metres relay, high jump and discus throw. The 800-metre race was controversial as many competitors were reportedly exhausted or unable to complete the race. Consequently, the IOC decided to drop the 800 metres from the programme; it was not reinstated until 1960. Halina Konopacka of Poland became the first female Olympic champion in athletics by winning the discus throw. At the gymnastics competition, the host Dutch team won the first gold medal for women in the sport. Tennis was removed from the program.

1932–1936
For the 1932 Summer Olympics, held in Los Angeles, the javelin throw and 80 meters hurdles were added. At the 1936 Winter Games in Garmisch-Partenkirchen, women competed in the alpine skiing combined event for the first time, with German Christl Cranz winning the gold medal. At the 1936 Summer Olympics held in Berlin, gymnastics returned to the programme for women.

1940–1944 
The 1940 Winter Olympics due to be held in Sapporo, 1940 Summer Olympics due to be held in Tokyo, 1944 Winter Olympics due to be held in Cortina d'Ampezzo and the 1944 Summer Olympics due to be held in London were all cancelled due to the outbreak of World War II. Six female Olympic athletes died due to World War II:

1948–1956 

At the 1948 Winter Olympics in St. Moritz, women made their debut in the downhill and slalom disciplines, having only competed in the combined event in 1936. In 1948, women competed in all of the same alpine skiing disciplines as the men. Barbara Ann Scott of Canada won the ladies' singles figure skating competition, marking the first time a non-European won the gold medal in the event. At the London 1948 Summer Olympics, women competed in canoeing for the first time. The women competed in the K-1 500 metres discipline. Alice Coachman won a gold medal in the women's high jump at the 1948 Summer Olympics, marking the first gold medal won by a Black woman for the United States. At the 1952 Winter Olympics held in Oslo, women competed in cross-country skiing for the first time. They competed in the 10 kilometre distance. At the 1952 Summer Olympics held in Helsinki, women were allowed to compete in equestrian for the first time. They competed in the dressage event which was open to both men and women to compete against one another. Danish equestrian Lis Hartel of Denmark won the silver medal in the individual competition alongside men. At the 1956 Winter Olympics held in Cortina d'Ampezzo, the 3 × 5 kilometre relay cross country event was added to the program. The 1956 Summer Olympics held in Melbourne, had a programme identical to that of the prior Olympiad.

1960–1968 

Speed skating for women. made its debut at the 1960 Winter Olympics held in Squaw Valley. Helga Haase, representing the United Team of Germany, won the inaugural gold medal for women, in the 500 metres event. The programme remained the same for the 1960 Summer Olympics held in Rome. At the 1964 Winter Olympics in Innsbruck, the women's 5km cross-country skiing event debuted. At the 1964 Summer Olympics held in Tokyo, Volleyball made its debut with the host Japanese taking the gold. At the 1968 Winter Olympics held in Grenoble, women's luge appeared for the first time. Erika Lechner of Italy won the gold after East German racers Ortrun Enderlein, Anna-Maria Müller and Angela Knösel allegedly heated the runners on their sleds and were disqualified. Whether the East Germans actually heated their sleds or if the situation was fabricated by the West Germans remains a mystery. At the 1968 Summer Olympics in Mexico City, women competed in shooting for the first time. The women competed in mixed events with the men and were allowed to compete in all seven disciplines.

1972–1980 
At the 1972 Winter Olympics held in Sapporo there were no changes to the sports open to women. At the 1972 Summer Olympics in Munich, archery was held for the first time since 1920. At the 1976 Winter Olympics in Innsbruck, ice dancing was added to the programme. Women competed in three new events at the 1976 Summer Olympics held in Montreal. Women debuted in basketball and handball. Women also competed for the first time in rowing, participating in six of the eight disciplines. There were no new events for women at the 1980 Winter Olympics held in Lake Placid. At the 1980 Summer Olympics held in Moscow, women's field hockey debuted. The underdog Zimbabwean team pulled off a major upset, winning the gold, the nation's first ever Olympic medal. However, these Olympics were marred by the US-led boycott of the games due to the Soviet invasion of Afghanistan.

1984–1992 

The women's 20 kilometre cross-country skiing event was added to the programme for the 1984 Winter Games in Sarajevo. Marja-Liisa Hämäläinen of Finland dominated the cross-country events, winning gold in all three distances.

Multiple new events for women were competed in at the 1984 Summer Olympics in Los Angeles. Synchronized swimming made its debut, with only women competing in the competition. The host Americans won gold in both the solo and duet events. Women also made their debut in cycling, competing in the road race. This event was also won by an American, Connie Carpenter. Also, rhythmic gymnastics appeared for the first time with only women competing; the winner was Canadian Lori Fung. The women's marathon also made its first appearance in these Games, with American Joan Benoit winning gold in 2:24:52, a time many thought was impossible for women just a few years earlier. These were also the first Games where women competed only against other women in shooting. These games were boycotted by the Soviet Union and its satellite states.

There were no new events at the 1988 Winter Olympics held in Calgary. At the 1988 Summer Olympics in Seoul, table tennis appeared for the first time for both men and women. They competed in the singles and doubles disciplines. Also, a female specific sailing event debuted at these Games, the women's 470 discipline. For the first time women competed in a track cycling event, the sprint.

In 1991, the IOC made it mandatory for all new sports applying for Olympic recognition to have female competitors. However, this rule only applied to new sports applying for Olympic recognition. This meant that any sports that were included in the Olympic programme prior to 1991 could continue to exclude female participants at the discretion of the sport's federation. At the 1992 Winter Olympics in Albertville, women competed in biathlon for the first time. The athletes competed in the individual, sprint and relay disciplines. Freestyle skiing also debuted at the 1992 Games, where women competed in the moguls discipline. Short track speed skating first appeared at these Games. Women competed in the 500 metres and the 3000 metre relay. At the 1992 Summer Olympics held in Barcelona, badminton appeared on the programme for the first time. Women competed in the singles and doubles competition. Women also competed in the sport of judo for the first time at these Games. 35 nations still sent all-male delegations to these Games. 1992 was the last Olympic games that skeet competition opens to both men and women, and the only mixed shooting competition at the Olympics ever won by a woman: Zhang Shan.

1994–2002 

At the 1994 Winter Olympics in Lillehammer, the aerials discipline of freestyle skiing officially debuted. Lina Cheryazova of Uzbekistan won the gold medal, which is to date her nation's sole medal at an Olympic Winter Games. Women's soccer and softball made their first appearances at the 1996 Games in Atlanta, where the hosts won gold in both. At the 1998 Winter Olympics in Nagano, ice hockey (with the United States winning gold) and curling (with Canada winning gold) debuted for women. Numerous new events made their premieres at the 2000 Summer Olympics in Sydney. Weightlifting, modern pentathlon, taekwondo, triathlon and trampoline all debuted in Australia. At the 2002 Winter Olympics in Salt Lake City, women's bobsleigh made its first appearance. Jill Bakken and Vonetta Flowers of the USA won the two-woman competition, the sole bobsleigh event for women at the 2002 Games.

2004–2012 

At the 2004 Summer Olympics in Athens, women appeared in wrestling for the first time competing in the freestyle weight classes of 48 kg, 55 kg, 63 kg and 72 kg. Women also competed in the sabre discipline of fencing for the first time, with Mariel Zagunis of the USA winning gold. In 2004, women from Afghanistan competed at the Olympics for the first time in their history after the nation was banned from Sydney 2000 by the IOC due to the Taliban government's opposition to women in sports. At the 2006 Winter Olympics in Turin, the programme remained unchanged. At the 2008 Summer Olympics in Beijing, a few new events were added. BMX cycling was held for the first time in 2008, debuting with the men's event. Women also competed in the 3000 m steeplechase and the 10 kilometre marathon swim for the first time. Baseball and boxing remained the only sports not open to women at these Games.

At the 2010 Winter Olympics in Vancouver, ski cross debuted for both women and men. Ashleigh McIvor of Canada won the inaugural gold for women in the sport. Controversy was created when women's ski jumping was excluded from the programme by the IOC due to the low number of athletes and participating nations in the sport. A group of fifteen competitive female ski jumpers later filed a suit against the Vancouver Organizing Committee for the 2010 Olympic and Paralympic Winter Games on the grounds that it violated the Canadian Charter of Rights and Freedoms since men were competing in the same event. The suit failed, with the judge ruling that the situation was not governed by the Charter. The 2012 Summer Olympics saw women's boxing make its debut. This, combined with the decision by the IOC to drop baseball from the programme for 2012, meant that women competed in every sport at a Summer Games for the first time. London 2012 also marked the first time that all national Olympic committees sent a female athlete to the Games. Brunei, Saudi Arabia and Qatar all had female athletes as a part of their delegations for the first time.

2014–2018 

At the 2014 Winter Olympics in Sochi, women's ski jumping made its first appearance. Carina Vogt of Germany won the first gold medal for women in the sport. The 2016 Summer Olympics in Rio de Janeiro saw the first rugby sevens competition. The tournament was won by the Australian team. Golf was also re-added to the programme for the first time for women since 1900. Inbee Park of South Korea won the tournament. The 2018 Winter Olympics in PyeongChang saw the addition of big air snowboarding, mixed doubles curling, mass start speed skating, and mixed team alpine skiing. Jamie Anderson of the USA was the silver medalist of the big air, also winning gold in slopestysle, becoming the most medaled female snowboarder at those games.

2020 
Transgender athletes have been nominally permitted at the Olympics since 2004, although only Tokyo 2020 (held in 2021) became the first Olympics in which a trans woman competed, with Laurel Hubbard entering the women's super heavyweight weightlifting event.

Women competed in softball, karate, sport climbing, surfing, and skateboarding at the 2020 Summer Olympics in Tokyo. 
The new sports climbing events - speed climbing, bouldering, and lead climbing - all had men's and women's categories. Several sports, such as swimming, introduced mixed events.

The length of tennis matches were changed so that men played three sets, the same as women in all previous Olympics.

The 2020 Olympics was the first Olympics in which women were allowed to compete in canoe sprint.  Before this Olympics, women were allowed to do sprint kayak, but not sprint canoe.
The 2020 Olympics was the first Olympics in which there was a women's 1500 meter freestyle swimming event.

Future Olympics 
The International Ski Federation has stated that it is aiming to include women's Nordic combined in the Olympic program for the first time at the 2022 Winter Olympics in Beijing. However, Nordic combined at the 2022 Winter Olympics ended up having three men only events, just as in 2018.

Sports 

Women have competed in the following sports at the Olympic Games.

Gender differences

Athletics
In combined events at the Olympics, women compete in the seven-event heptathlon but men compete in three more events in the decathlon. A women's pentathlon was held from 1964 to 1980, before being expanded to the heptathlon.

In sprint hurdles at the Olympics, men compete in the 110 metres hurdles, while women cover 100 metres. Women ran 80 metres up to the 1968 Olympics; this was extended to 100 metres in 1961, albeit on a trial basis, the new distance of 100 metres became official in 1969. No date has been given for the addition of the 10 metres. Both men and women clear a total of ten hurdles during the races and both genders take three steps between the hurdles at elite level. Any amendment to the women's distance to match the men's would impact either the athlete technique or number of hurdles in the event, or result in the exclusion of women with shorter strides.

Historically, women competed over 3000 metres until this was matched to the men's 5000 metres event in 1996. Similarly, women competed in a 10 kilometres race walk in 1992 and 1996 before this was changed to the standard men's distance of 20 km. The expansion of the women's athletics programme to match the men's was a slow one. Triple jump was added in 1996, hammer throw and pole vault in 2000, and steeplechase in 2008. The sole difference remaining is the men-only 50 kilometres race walk event. While the inclusion of a women's 50 km event has been advocated, proposals have also been mooted to remove the men's event entirely from the Olympics.

Boxing
At the summer Olympics, men's boxing competitions take place over three three-minute rounds and women's over four rounds of two minutes each. Women also compete in three weight categories against 10 for men.

Canoeing
Canoeing excluded women at the Olympics from both the sprint and slalom disciplines until Tokyo 2020.

Shooting

Women are excluded from the 25 metres rapid fire pistol, the 50 metres pistol and the 50 metres rifle prone events. Men are excluded from the 25 metres pistol event. From 1996 to 2004, women participated in the double trap competition. The women's event was taken off the Olympic program after the 2004 Summer Olympics. Final shooting for women was discontinued in international competition as a result.

Road cycling
Since 1984, when women's cycling events were introduced, the women's road race has been 140 kilometres to the men's 250 kilometres. The time trials are 29 kilometres and 44 kilometres respectively. Each country is limited to sending five men and four women to the Summer Games.

Tennis
Until the 2020 games, women competed in three-set matches at the Olympics as opposed to five sets for men. The men's matches were shortened for Tokyo 2020.

Soccer 
In Olympic soccer, there is no age restriction for women, whereas the men's teams field under-23 teams with a maximum of three over-aged players.

Gender equality 
Historically, female athletes have been treated, portrayed and looked upon differently from their male counterparts. In the early days of the Olympic Games, many NOCs sent fewer female competitors because they would incur the cost of a chaperone, which was not necessary for the male athletes. While inequality in participation has declined throughout history, women are still sometimes treated differently at the Games themselves. For example, in 2012, the Japan women's national soccer team travelled to the Games in economy class, while the men's team travelled in business class. Although women compete in all sports at the summer Olympics, there are still 39 events that are not open to women. Men have to compete in longer and tougher events, such as 110 meters hurdles, compared to 100 meters hurdles for women. In a study done by “Women in International Elite Athletics: Gender (in)equality and National Participation.” it was found within this study by the testing of macro-social gender equality, that within countries that have a higher affiliation with the Muslim religion, there was less of a push for women to pursue sports. This also was slightly true in the idea that if the World Sports organization made more pushes for equality campaigns, there would be a correlation in the amount of women who play these sports.

Media 
Historically, coverage and inclusion of women's team sports in the Olympics has been limited. It has been shown that commentators are more likely to refer to female athletes using "non-sporting terminology" than they are for men. A 2016 study published by Cambridge University Press found that women were more likely to be described using physical features, age, marital status and aesthetics than men were, as opposed to sport related adjectives and descriptions. The same study found that women were also more likely to be referred to as "girls" than men were to be called "boys" in commentary. This disparity in the quality of coverage for women's Olympic sports has been attributed to the fact that 90% of sports journalists are male.

Coverage of women's sports has typically been lower than men's. From 1992 to 1998, American women have always had less raw clock time when being covered on television. Compared to American men, the women have only had 44, 47, and 40 percent of the Olympic television coverage, respectively.

Role of the International Olympic Committee

The International Olympic Committee (IOC) was created by Pierre, Baron de Coubertin, in 1894 and is now considered "the supreme authority of the Olympic movement". Its headquarters are located in Lausanne, Switzerland.  The title of supreme authority of the Olympic movement consists of many different duties, which include promoting Olympic values, maintaining the regular celebration of the Olympic Games, and supporting any organization that is connected with the Olympic movement.

Some of the Olympic values that the IOC promotes are practicing sport ethically, eliminating discrimination from sports, encouraging women's involvement in sport, fighting the use of drugs in sport, and blending sport, culture, and education. The IOC supports these values by creating different commissions that focus on a particular area. These commissions hold conferences throughout the year where different people around the world discuss ideas and ways to implement the Olympic values into the lives of people internationally. The commissions also have the responsibility of reporting their findings to the President of the IOC and its executive board. The President has the authority to assign members to different commissions based on the person's interests and specialties.

The first two female IOC members were the Venezuelan Flor Isava-Fonseca and the Norwegian Pirjo Häggman and were co-opted as IOC members in 1981.

The IOC can contain up to 115 members, and currently, the members of the IOC come from 79 countries. The IOC is considered a powerful authority throughout the world as it creates policies that become standards for other countries to follow in the sporting arena.

Only 20 of the current 106 members of the IOC are women.

Women in Sport Commission 

A goal of the IOC is to encourage these traditional countries to support women's participation in sport because two of the IOC's Olympic values that it must uphold are ensuring the lack of discrimination in sports and promoting women's involvement in sport. The commission that was created to promote the combination of these values was the Women in Sport Commission. This commission declares its role as "advis[ing] the IOC Executive Board on the policy to deploy in the area of promoting women in sport". This commission did not become fully promoted to its status until 2004, and it meets once a year to discuss its goals and implementations. This commission also presents a Women and Sport Trophy annually which recognizes a woman internationally who has embodied the values of the IOC and who has supported efforts to increase women's participation in sport at all levels. This trophy is supposed to symbolize the IOC's commitment to honoring those who are beneficial to gender equality in sports.

Another way that the IOC tried to support women's participation in sport was allowing women to become members. In 1990, Flor Isava Fonseca became the first woman elected to the executive board of the IOC. The first American woman member of the IOC was Anita DeFrantz, who became a member in 1986 and in 1992 began chairing the prototype of the IOC Commission on Women in Sport. DeFrantz not only worked towards promoting gender equality in sports, but she also wanted to move toward gender equality in the IOC so women could be equally represented. She believed that without equal representation in the IOC that women's voices would not get an equal chance to be heard. She was instrumental in creating a new IOC policy that required the IOC membership to be composed of at least 20 percent women by 2005. She also commissioned a study conducted in 1989 and again in 1994 that focused on the difference between televised coverage of men's and women's sports. Inequality still exists in this area, but her study was deemed to be eye opening to how substantial the problem was and suggested ways to increase reporting on women's sporting events. DeFrantz is now head of the Women in Sport Commission.

The IOC failed in its policy requiring 20 percent of IOC members to be women by 2005. By June 2012, the policy had still not been achieved, with only 20 out of 106 IOC members women, an 18.8 percent ratio. Only 4 percent of National Olympic Committees have female presidents.

Impact of the Women's World Games

Background 

In 1919, French translator and amateur rower, Alice Milliat initiated talks with the IOC and International Association of Athletics Federations with the goal of having women's athletics included at the 1924 Summer Olympics. After her request was refused, she organized the first "Women's Olympiad", hosted in Monte Carlo. This would become the precursor to the first Women's World Games. The event was seen as a protest against the IOC's refusal to include females in athletics and a message to their President Pierre de Coubertin who was opposed to women at the Olympics. Milliat went on to found the International Women's Sports Federation who organized the first Women's World Games.

The Games 
The first ever "Women's Olympic Games" were held in Paris in 1922. The athletes competed in eleven events: 60 metres, 100 yards, 300 metres, 1000 metres, 4 x 110 yards relay, Hurdling 100 yards, high jump, long jump, standing long jump, javelin and shot put. 20,000 people attended the Games and 18 world records were set. Despite the successful outcome of the event, the IOC still refused to include women's athletics at the 1924 Summer Olympics. On top of this, the IOC and IAAF objected to the use of the term "Olympic" in the event, so the IWSF changed the name of the event to the Women's World Games for the 1926 version. The 1926 Women's World Games would be held in Gothenburg, Sweden. The discus throw was added to the programme. These Games were also attended by 20,000 spectators and finally convinced the IOC to allow women to compete in the Olympics in some athletics events. The IOC let women compete in 100 metres, 800 metres, 4 × 100 metres relay, high jump and discus throw in 1928. There would be two more editions of the Women's World Games, 1930 in Prague and 1934 in London. The IWSF was forced to fold after the Government of France pulled funding in 1936. Pierre de Coubertin, founder of the International Olympic Committee, was quoted with saying "I do not approve of the participation of women in public competitions. In the Olympic Games, their primary role should be to crown the victors."

See also 

 20th century women's fitness culture
 Olympic games
 Women's sports
 Women's professional sports
 LGBT issues at the Olympic and Paralympic Games
 List of LGBT Olympians

Notes

References

Bibliography

 
 
 
 
 
 
 
 
 
 
 
 
  
 
 
 
 
 
 
 
 
 
 

Olympics
Olympics
Women